meta-Hydroxyphenylhydracrylic acid is a metabolite in the degradation of (+)-catechin in the crab-eating macaque (Macaca irus) excreted in the urine. It is also a substance found in human urine.

References 

Phenols
Beta hydroxy acids